Quzluy-e Olya, also known as Qowzlu-ye Bala, may refer to:
 Quzluy-e Olya, Mahabad
 Quzluy-e Olya, Shahin Dezh